Derrick Gray (born November 11, 1985) is a former American football defensive end. He was signed by the Oakland Raiders as an undrafted free agent in 2008. He played college football at Texas Southern.

He was also a member of the California Redwoods.

External links
Just Sports Stats
Oakland Raiders bio
United Football League bio

1985 births
Living people
American football defensive ends
Calgary Stampeders players
Sacramento Mountain Lions players
Oakland Raiders players
People from Silver Spring, Maryland
Players of American football from Maryland
Texas Southern Tigers football players